Myctophum phengodes, the Bright lanternfish, is a species of lanternfish.

References

External links

Detailed Info related to Myctophum Phengodes

Myctophidae
Taxa named by Christian Frederik Lütken
Fish described in 1892